

Tschawinersee is a lake in the canton of Valais, Switzerland. Located at an elevation of 2174 m, its surface area is 6.2 ha.

See also
List of mountain lakes of Switzerland

Lakes of Valais